"Do Ya Wanna Get Funky with Me" is a 1977 single recorded by Peter Brown.  The record sold more than one million copies.  It was his first hit song.  Backing vocals were provided by Wildflower.

The song reached #18 in the U.S. and #3 R&B. It also charted in the United Kingdom, peaking at #43.

Chicago radio superstation WLS, which gave the song much airplay, ranked "Do Ya Wanna Get Funky with Me" as the 35th most popular hit of 1977.
It reached as high as number three on their survey of October 22, 1977.

Track listing

1977 release 
12" vinyl
 US: TK Disco / 35

Chart performance

Weekly charts

Year-end charts

Legacy
"Do Ya Wanna Get Funky with Me" was covered by industrial disco band My Life with the Thrill Kill Kult on their 2005 album Gay, Black and Married.
"Burning Love Breakdown" appeared on the fictional radio station K109 The Studio in the Grand Theft Auto IV universe.

References

External links
 Lyrics of this song
 

1977 singles
Peter Brown (singer) songs
Songs written by Peter Brown (singer)
1977 songs
Disco songs
TK Records singles